Following is a table of United States presidential elections in Texas, ordered by year. Since its admission to statehood in 1845, Texas has participated in every U.S. presidential election except the 1864 election during the American Civil War, when the state had seceded to join the Confederacy, and the 1868 election, when the state was undergoing Reconstruction.

In its first century, Texas was a Democratic bastion in the mold of the "Solid South", only voting for another party once–– in 1928, when anti-Catholic sentiment against Democrat nominee Al Smith drove Texas' largely-Protestant electorate to back Republican Herbert Hoover. A gradual trend towards increasing social liberalism in the Democratic Party, however, has turned the state (apart from Hispanic South Texas, the Trans-Pecos, and several large cities) into generally a Republican stronghold. Since 1980, Texas has voted for the Republican nominee in every presidential election.

Winners of the state are in bold. The shading refers to the state winner, and not the national winner.

Elections from 1864 to present

Election of 1860

The election of 1860 was a complex realigning election in which the breakdown of the previous two-party alignment culminated in four parties each competing for influence in different parts of the country. The result of the election, with the victory of an ardent opponent of slavery, spurred the secession of eleven states and brought about the American Civil War.

Elections prior to 1860

See also
 Elections in Texas

Notes

References